CalSO or Calso may refer to

 California Standard Oil, now Chevron Corporation
 California Student Orientation at University of California, Berkeley